Wawasan Open University, abbreviated as WOU, is a private university located in Penang, Malaysia that provides working adults with access to higher education via open distance learning (ODL).

It was established in 2006 and enrolled its first batch of students in 2007. In September 2013, WOU began to also offer full-time degree programmes to STPM school leavers and diploma holders at its Main Campus in Penang.

Academic programmes and accreditation 
The university currently offers a large number of part-time programmes at the undergraduate and postgraduate level. The programmes include management, accounting, banking and finance, sales and marketing, psychology, liberal studies, English studies, construction management, electronics, manufacturing management, and education (including early childhood education).

The university also offers 11 full-time Bachelor's degree programmes at its campus in Penang in such fields as management, accounting, sales and marketing, banking and finance, logistics and supply chain management, and computer systems and networks.

All WOU programmes are accredited by the Malaysian Qualifications Agency (MQA) and approved by the Malaysian Ministry of Education (MOE). WOU achieved a Tier-5 or "Excellent" rating in the SETARA local university ranking exercise conducted by the MOE in 2011 and 2013.

Campus 
The university's main campus is located by the sea in the northeastern part of Penang Island, Malaysia. The main campus consists of two buildings: a heritage mansion called Homestead and the modern 12-storey Al-Bukhary Building. In addition to its main campus in Penang, WOU operates four regional centres in Ipoh, Kuala Lumpur, Johor Bahru and Kuching to support its distance learners located in and around those cities. It also has two smaller regional support centres in Bandar Utama and Klang.

Faculties
There are four schools in Wawasan Open University:
 School of Science and Technology
 School of Education, Humanities and Social Sciences
 School of Business and Administration
 School of Digital Technology

WOU also has the following centres and institute:
 Centre for Graduate Studies
 Centre for Professional Development and Continuing Education (PACE)
 Institute for Research and Innovation (IRI)

Administration

Chief Executive and Vice Chancellor

Professor Dr Lily Chan has been appointed as the fourth Vice Chancellor in April 2019. She takes over the helm from Professor Dato’ Dr Ho Sinn Chye, who left the University at the end of 2017. In the interim, the Acting Vice Chancellor was Professor Dr Zoraini Wati Abas.

Chancellor

Eminent sports administrator and former Olympic Council of Malaysia (OCM) president Tunku Tan Sri Imran Tuanku Ja’afar has been appointed as the fourth Chancellor of WOU. He succeeds Tun Mohamed Dzaiddin Abdullah, a former Chief Justice of Malaysia, who served for five years until December 2018.

Pro-chancellor

Retired medical researcher and veteran politician Dato’ Dr Lim Thuang Seng has assumed the mantle of Pro-Chancellor of WOU. He takes over from Tan Sri Dr Koh Tsu Koon, a former Chief Minister of Penang. A central committee member of Parti Gerakan Rakyat Malaysia (Gerakan) since 1987, Dr Lim served as the Selangor State Executive Councillor for Health, Tourism and Consumer Affairs from 2004 to 2008.

Partner Institution

Hong Kong
Open University of Hong Kong

Japan
Toyohashi University of Technology

Malaysia
Universiti Tunku Abdul Rahman
Tunku Abdul Rahman University College
International Centre for Education in Islamic Finance
Penang Skills Development Centre

India
SNDT Women's University

Sri Lanka
Open University of Sri Lanka

References

External links

 Official Wawasan Open University (WOU) Website

Educational institutions established in 2006
Universities and colleges in Penang
Open universities
Business schools in Malaysia
Information technology schools in Malaysia
Distance education institutions based in Malaysia
Buildings and structures in George Town, Penang
2006 establishments in Malaysia
Private universities and colleges in Malaysia